Maicon Souza may refer to:

Maicon (footballer, born 1985), full name Maicon Thiago Pereira de Souza, Brazilian football midfielder
Maicon Souza (footballer) (born 1989), Brazilian football midfielder